Sylvicola alternatus is a species of wood gnat in the family Anisopodidae.  It is found in states between Wisconsin and Maine and between Texas and Georgia.

References

External links

 

Anisopodidae
Articles created by Qbugbot
Insects described in 1823
Taxa named by Thomas Say